Xiphopterus is an extinct genus of prehistoric perciform fish that lived from the early to middle Eocene.

See also

 Prehistoric fish
 List of prehistoric bony fish

References

Eocene fish
Scombridae
Prehistoric perciform genera